Catolesia is a genus of flowering plants in the family Asteraceae.

 Species
Both known species are endemic to the State of Bahia in eastern Brazil.
 Catolesia huperzioides N.Roque, H.Rob. & A.A.Conc. 
 Catolesia mentiens D.J.N.Hind

References

Eupatorieae
Asteraceae genera
Endemic flora of Brazil